The Williams-Cangie WC-1 Sundancer is an American homebuilt biplane racing aircraft that was designed by Art Williams and Carl Cangie and built by Ralph Thenhaus in 1974. Plans were at one time available from Williams' company, the Williams Aircraft Design Company of Northridge, California. Only one was built.

Design and development
The WC-1 Sundancer features an unusual biplane layout, with the upper wing just below the cockpit canopy and the lower gull wing mounted at the bottom of the fuselage. The wings are joined by a single interplane strut. It has a single-seat enclosed cockpit under a bubble canopy, fixed conventional landing gear and a single engine in tractor configuration. The fuselage was derived from the Bushby Midget Mustang.

The aircraft is made from aluminum sheet, with the fuselage flush riveted stressed skin. Its  span wing has no flaps. The engine used was the  Lycoming O-290-D2 powerplant.

Operational history
Only one example was built. It was registered in the United States with the Federal Aviation Administration in 1974.

The WC-1 was raced by pilot Sidney White and won the biplane class at the Reno Air Races. It also won five more class races in 1974.

Aircraft on display
San Diego Air & Space Museum – sole example

Specifications (WC-1 Sundancer)

References

External links
Photo of the WC-1 in the San Diego Air & Space Museum
Photo of the WC-1 in the San Diego Air & Space Museum

Williams-Cangie WC-1 Sundancer
1970s United States sport aircraft
Single-engined tractor aircraft
Sesquiplanes
Homebuilt aircraft
Racing aircraft
Aircraft first flown in 1974